The subdesert mesite (Monias benschi) is a ground-dwelling bird endemic to Madagascar. It is one of three species in the mesite family Mesitornithidae, and is restricted in distribution to a small low-land region in southwest Madagascar.

Description
The subdesert mesite is a medium-sized terrestrial bird which is often described as rail-like (a family with which the mesites are sometimes placed). The species has a long and downward-curved bill distinguishing it from the other members of the family. Both sexes are greyish above and show thin white eyebrows. Both have white underparts; the male has black crescent-shaped spots on the side of the neck and upper breast. The female has rufous spots that may merge into a general rufous tone, and has a tawny cheek patch.

Distribution and habitat
To the north of Manombo there is an area of circa  where the habitat is still suitable; elsewhere the habitat is becoming fragmented.

Behaviour and ecology
The subdesert mesite forages by picking invertebrates, seeds and fruit off the ground and may dig into the surface. The birds nests are exposed platforms of twigs built in a bush within  of the ground. One or two eggs are laid and the incubation and care of the young is shared by both sexes. They may be polyandrous or polygynous. The birds live in communal groups and have a loud ″nak! nak!″ alarm call when disturbed.

Status
The population of this species may be dense within its restricted geographic range. It is vulnerable to habitat degradation, by slash-and-burn cultivation of maize, burning for charcoal, commercial timber and for construction. which is happening in most of its range apart from to the north of Manombo. The birds are also taken by dogs, by hunting, and introduced rats (Rattus sp) may also be a problem. In 2002 there was an estimated population 115,000 and it is estimated that numbers are falling. The International Union for Conservation of Nature has classified the conservation status of this bird as ″vulnerable″.

References

 Handbook of the Birds of the World, Volume Three, Hoatzin to Auks; de Hoyo, Elliot and Sargatal,

External links
 BirdLife Species Factsheet.

subdesert mesite
Endemic birds of Madagascar
subdesert mesite
Taxa named by Guillaume Grandidier
Taxa named by Émile Oustalet